Posey House may refer to:

Posey House, Corydon, Indiana, a historic house within Corydon Historic District
John V. G. Posey House, Portland, Oregon, listed on the National Register